Talking to You may refer to:
 Talking to You (Jakob Sveistrup song)
 Talking to You (Izzy Bizu song)